Sue Clark may refer to:
 Sue Cassidy Clark, American music journalist and photographer
 Sue Brannon Clark, environmental radiochemist

See also
 Susan Clark, Canadian actress
 Susan Clark (sailor), American sailor
 Susan J. Clark, Australian biomedical researcher